The 1981 McDonald's All-American Boys Game was an All-star basketball game played on Saturday, April 11, 1981, at the Levitt Arena in Wichita, Kansas. The game's rosters featured the best and most highly recruited high school boys graduating in 1981. The game was the 4th annual version of the McDonald's All-American Game first played in 1978.

1981 game 
The game was not televised, but highlights were aired by NBC Sports during Sportsworld on April 12. The East roster included the best big man in the 1981 class, Patrick Ewing (who did not play in this game), guard Michael Jordan and forward Chris Mullin. The West team could count on local stars Greg Dreiling, a 7-1 center who averaged 26.7 points for his high school team, and guard Aubrey Sherrod, the only player who was still undecided regarding his college choice. Both players went on to attend Wichita State. The West team also had more size, having 7 players standing 6-9 or taller, while the East had two of the best guards, Jordan and Milt Wagner. The game started at 8 PM and initially saw the West team take the lead, with the East team scoring their first points on a Jordan jumpshot with 7:54 minutes left in the first quarter. Jordan's basket started a 10-point run for the East, which outscored the West 21-12 in the first quarter. The second quarter ended 31-28 in favor of the West team, and at halftime the score was East 49, West 43. The East kept the lead until the fourth quarter, when the West went ahead 81-80 on a Hurt layup with 6:34 left. Aubrey Sherrod scored on a jumpshot with 22 seconds remaining, and the score was West 95, East 94. When the East regained possession of the ball, Jordan was fouled, and scored both free throws bringing the score to 96-95 for the East team. The West could win the game but Mark Acres missed the decisive free throw, shooting it short, and the game ended with the East win. Jordan set a new scoring record with 30 points on 13/19 shooting (4/4 from the free throw line): the record lasted for 18 years, until the 1999 game when Jonathan Bender scored 31 points. Despite Jordan's scoring effort, the MVP award went to Adrian Branch and Aubrey Sherrod. Of the 25 players, 14 went on to play at least 1 game in the NBA.

East roster

West roster

Coaches 
The East team was coached by:
 Head Coach Mike Jarvis of Rindge and Latin High School (Cambridge, Massachusetts)

The West team was coached by:
 Head Coach Jim Yerkovich of Judge Memorial Catholic High School (Salt Lake City, Utah)
 Asst Coach Sonny Tangaro of Judge Memorial Catholic High School (Salt Lake City, Utah)

References

External links 
McDonald's All-American on the web
McDonald's All-American all-time rosters
McDonald's All-American rosters at Basketball-Reference.com
Game stats at Realgm.com

1980–81 in American basketball
1981
1981 in sports in Kansas
Basketball competitions in Kansas
Sports competitions in Wichita, Kansas